Harutaka (written: 敏隆 or 治孝) is a masculine Japanese given name. Notable people with the name include:

, Japanese kugyō
, Japanese footballer

Japanese masculine given names